Akçin can refer to:

 Akçin, Ayvacık
 Akçin, Dinar